Arthur Carew Richards (20 February 1865 – 29 November 1930) was an English first-class cricketer and British Army officer.

The son of the cricketer and clergyman William Richards, he was born at Grays, Essex in February 1865. He was educated at Eton College, where he played for the college cricket eleven.

Richards made his first-class debut for Hampshire in 1884 against Sussex. Richards made two appearances for Hampshire in the 1884 season, the second of which was against Somerset in what was to be Hampshire's final season with first-class status until the 1895 County Championship.

Nine years after Hampshire had regained their first-class status and nineteen years after last representing the county, Richards played a single first-class match in 1903 against Essex. Richards final first-class appearance for Hampshire came in 1904 against Sussex.

In his four first-class matches for Hampshire, Richards scored 104 runs at a batting average of 17.33, with a high score of 47. With the ball Richards took 3 wickets at a bowling average of 37.33, with best figures of 3/45.

Military career
Richards was commissioned a lieutenant in the Hampshire Regiment on 8 December 1886, and served with the 1st Battalion in the Burmese Expedition 1887-89, where he was slightly wounded. He was promoted to captain on 14 July 1893, and later transferred to the 2nd Battalion, with which he served in the Second Boer War from 1900 to 1902. After arrival in South Africa in early 1900, he took part in the battles of Paardeberg (Feb 1900), Poplar Grove (7 March 1900), Karee, Brandfort and de Vet and Zand Rivers; and the occupation of the Boer capitals Bloemfontein (March 1900) and Pretoria (June 1900). He was District Commander at Hoopstad from June 1900 until April 1901, was mentioned in despatches and received the Queen's South Africa Medal (with three clasps). Following the end of hostilities in early June 1902, he left Cape Town on board the SS Orotava, and arrived at Southampton the next month. From November 1902 he was adjutant of the 5th (Isle of Wight ´Princess Beatrice´s) Volunteer Battalion of the Hampshire Regiment.

Richards died at Nottingham, Nottinghamshire on 29 November 1930.

References

External links
Arthur Richards at Cricinfo
Arthur Richards at CricketArchive

1865 births
1930 deaths
People from Grays, Essex
Sportspeople from Essex
People educated at Eton College
English cricketers
Hampshire cricketers